Scott Stricklin may refer to:
 Scott Stricklin (athletic director), athletic director of the University of Florida
 Scott Stricklin (baseball), head coach of the University of Georgia baseball team